787 Moskva is a minor planet orbiting the Sun. It is a dynamic member of the Maria asteroid family orbiting near the 3:1 Kirkwood gap. This is an S-type (stony) asteroid spanning 27 km. The surface mineralogy is consistent with mesosiderite silicates.

Object 1914 UQ, discovered 20 April 1914 by Grigory Neujmin, was named 787 Moskva, after the capital of Russia, Moscow (and retains that name to this day). Object 1934 FD discovered on 19 March 1934 by C. Jackson was given the sequence number 1317. In 1938, G. N. Neujmin found that asteroid 1317 and 787 Moskva were, in fact, the same object. Sequence number 1317 was later reused for the object 1935 RC discovered on 1 September 1935 by Karl Reinmuth; that object is now known as 1317 Silvretta.

Photometric observations at the Palmer Divide Observatory in Colorado Springs, Colorado in 1999 were used to build a light curve for this object. The asteroid displayed a rotation period of 6.056 ± 0.001 hours and a brightness variation of 0.62 ± 0.01 in magnitude.

References

External links 
 Lightcurve plot of 787 Moskva, Palmer Divide Observatory, B. D. Warner (1999)
 Asteroid Lightcurve Database (LCDB), query form (info )
 Dictionary of Minor Planet Names, Google books
 Asteroids and comets rotation curves, CdR – Observatoire de Genève, Raoul Behrend
 Discovery Circumstances: Numbered Minor Planets (1)-(5000) – Minor Planet Center
 
 

000787
Moskva
Moskva
19140420